"I Know" is a song written and performed by American rapper Jay-Z featuring fellow American musician Pharrell. Produced by The Neptunes (Pharrell and Chad Hugo), the song was released on November 4, 2007 as the third and final single from Jay-Z's tenth studio album, American Gangster.

Music video
The music video was leaked to the internet on Yahoo! Music on January 28, 2008. It premiered on Yahoo! on February 26, 2008.

The video (directed by Philip Andelman) features Zoë Kravitz playing multiple roles. The director described it as "a surreal, daydream-like blending of four separate and unrelated stories, four unique trips taken on by four girls in one night in New York City."

Each girl experiences a different "high"—one, a seemingly well-to-do young woman, appears under the influence while in her apartment, another experiences the joy of love, another is taken with the beauty of the night sky in New York City to the confusion of her friends, and finally, the last young woman becomes "high" through music while at a night club.

This is Jay-Z's second music video in which he does not appear at all, counting the music video for "Wishing on a Star" (1998), which was only released in the UK.

Charts

Weekly charts

Year-end charts

References

2007 singles
Jay-Z songs
Pharrell Williams songs
Song recordings produced by the Neptunes
Songs written by Pharrell Williams
Songs written by Jay-Z
Roc-A-Fella Records singles
Music videos directed by Philip Andelman
2007 songs